The KTM RC16 is a prototype grand prix racing motorcycle which was developed to race in the MotoGP series by KTM, starting from the 2017 season.

History
The RC16 made its debut as a wildcard entry at the 2016 Valencian Community motorcycle Grand Prix with test rider Mika Kallio. For KTM's return to MotoGP in 2017, their new factory team signed 2009 125cc runner-up, Bradley Smith and the 2013 Moto2 Champion, Pol Espargaró from Monster Yamaha Tech3. Their team principals are Pit Beirer and Aki Ajo who is also Red Bull KTM Ajo's team principal.

On November 18, 2018, the RC16 achieved its first ever podium finish, having finished in 3rd place in the 2018 Valencian Community motorcycle Grand Prix with Pol Espargaró, after starting the race from 6th on the grid. Starting from 2019, the French private team Tech3 became KTM's first satellite team.

For the 2020 season, KTM completely redesigned the RC16 chassis based on feedback from development rider Dani Pedrosa. The upgraded RC16 features a hybrid chassis design (combining elements of twin spar and trellis frame designs) manufactured from steel, and a carbon fibre swingarm. In 2020 Brad Binder achieved KTM's first win as a constructor in the premier MotoGP class at the Czech Grand Prix. Miguel Oliveira took KTM's second race win, and first for satellite team Tech3, just two rounds later at the Styrian Grand Prix. Oliviera repeated the feat for KTM's third victory with a win at the season-closing Portuguese Grand Prix. With a further five third-place podiums from Pol Espargaró, the KTM factory team finished third in the teams' championship and KTM finished fourth in the constructor's championship, ahead of Honda and Aprilia.

Designation 
The motorcycle's name derives from KTM's long-standing usage of the "RC" designation (short for "Road/Competition") for its sportbikes, beginning with the RC8, RC 390, and RC 125 production models and also applied since 2012 to the RC250GP Moto3 machine. The "16" designation is related to the number of valves in the engine (4 valves per cylinder x 4 cylinders), keeping with KTM tradition as used in similars designations such as the former V-twin 1190 RC8 model and the various LC4 single-cylinder models.

Specifications

Complete MotoGP results

Motorcycle summary
These results are accurate up to the 2022 Valencian GP.

Races won: 7
2020: Miguel Oliveira 2, Brad Binder 1 (3 in total)
2021: Brad Binder 1, Miguel Oliveira 1 (2 in total)
2022: Miguel Oliveira 2 (2 in total)

Podiums: 18
2018: Pol Espargaró 1 (1 in total)
2020: Pol Espargaró 5, Miguel Oliveira 2, Brad Binder 1 (8 in total)
2021: Miguel Oliveira 3, Brad Binder 1 (4 in total)
2022: Miguel Oliveira 2, Brad Binder 3 (5 in total)

Poles: 3
2020: Pol Espargaró 2, Miguel Oliveira 1 (3 in total)

Legend

* Season still in progress.

See also 
 Aprilia RS-GP
 Honda RC213V
 Suzuki GSX-RR
 Yamaha YZR-M1
 Ducati Desmosedici

References 

RC16
Grand Prix motorcycles
Motorcycles introduced in 2016